Brétigny is a railway station in Brétigny-sur-Orge, Essonne, Paris, France. The station was opened in 1865 and is located on the Paris–Bordeaux railway and Paris–Tours railway. The station is served by Paris' express suburban rail system, the RER. The train services are operated by SNCF.

2013 derailment

On 12 July 2013, an intercity train from Paris Gare d'Austerlitz to Limoges derailed and crashed at the station, killing at least six people and injuring "dozens" more. 385 passengers were on board at the time of the crash.

Initial reports suggest the train, which was not scheduled to stop at the station, split in two, causing the rear four carriages to collide with the station platforms.

Train services
The following services serve the station:

Local services (RER C) Saint-Martin d'Étampes–Juvisy–Paris–Issy–Versailles-Chantiers–Saint-Quentin-en-Yvelines
Local services (RER C) Dourdan–Juvisy–Paris–Issy–Versailles-Chantiers–Saint-Quentin-en-Yvelines
Local services (RER C) Dourdan–Juvisy–Paris–Ermont Eaubonne–Montigny
Local services (RER C) Brétigny–Juvisy–Paris–Ermont Eaubonne–Montigny

See also

 List of stations of the Paris RER

References

External links

 

Railway stations in Essonne
Réseau Express Régional stations
Railway stations in France opened in 1865